Natalie Lowe (born 15 August 1980) is an Australian ballroom dancer. She is a four-time Australian ballroom dance champion. Lowe competed on, and won, Australia's Dancing with the Stars with celebrity partner Anthony Koutoufides. She later joined the BBC's Strictly Come Dancing. She competed on Strictly for seven series, leaving after the 2016 series concluded.

Early life
Lowe grew up in Sydney, New South Wales. Lowe's family lived next door to a ballroom dance studio. At age 5, Lowe began taking dance lessons after watching her older brother and sister dance. Lowe went on to become a four-time Australian ballroom dance Champion.

Career

Australia's Dancing with the Stars
She joined Seven Network's Dancing with the Stars in 2004, partnering athlete Matt Shirvington. She then partnered Ian Roberts, and won the 2006 series with AFL footballer Anthony Koutoufides. Lowe then partnered Home and Away actor Tim Campbell, and, in 2008, partnered boxer Danny Green.

Strictly Come Dancing
Highest and lowest scoring performances per dance

In 2009, Lowe competed as a new professional dancer on the seventh series of the original British version of Strictly Come Dancing, partnering Hollyoaks' Ricky Whittle. Lowe joined the show with fellow newcomers Aliona Vilani and Katya Virshilas. After their first dance together in front of the judges, Lowe and Whittle were described by head judge Len Goodman as maybe the most formidable couple Strictly Come Dancing had ever seen. Even so, Lowe and Whittle finished second. Lowe competed in the 2010 series partnering Scott Maslen. Lowe and Maslen were eliminated in the semi-final of the competition along with Gavin Henson and Katya Virshilas. 

On 15 June 2011, the BBC announced that Lowe would again be one of the professional dancers in the 2011 series of Strictly Come Dancing. She was partnered by Audley Harrison (champion boxer) and they were the sixth couple to leave. In the 2012 tenth series her partner was former England cricket captain Michael Vaughan; they  placed 7th. In 2013, it was revealed that Lowe would return for the eleventh series; however she suffered a foot injury during training and was replaced by Aliona Vilani. Lowe returned for the twelfth series, as partner to television presenter Tim Wonnacott. In March 2015 Lowe won comic relief special, 'The People's Strictly', with veteran, Cassidy Little. She also participated in the thirteenth series main series of the show and was partnered with celebrity chef Ainsley Harriott. Harriott and Lowe were eliminated in the fifth week of competition. Lowe then competed again with Little in the 2015 Christmas Special. In Series 14 she was partnered with Olympic long jump champion Greg Rutherford. On May 4, 2017, Lowe announced her departure from the show after seven series.

Strictly Come Dancing performances

Series 7 – with celebrity dance partner Ricky Whittle

Series 8 – with celebrity dance partner Scott Maslen

Series 9 – with celebrity dance partner Audley Harrison

Series 10 – with celebrity dance partner Michael Vaughan

Series 12 – with celebrity dance partner Tim Wonnacott

Series 13 – with celebrity dance partner Ainsley Harriott

Series 14 - with celebrity dance partner Greg Rutherford

Other projects
Beginning in 2005, Lowe joined the cast of the ballroom dance stage show Burn the Floor. Lowe toured with the show for five years. In March 2013, Lowe launched FitSteps, a dance inspired fitness program, with fellow Strictly professional dancer Ian Waite and former Strictly celebrity Mark Foster.

Personal life
In October 2015, Lowe announced her engagement to company director James Knibbs. Lowe first met Knibbs when they sat opposite each other on a train ride to London. Lowe married Knibbs in July 2018. Lowe gave birth to a baby boy, Jack, in December 2019.

References

External links
Personal website

1980 births
Living people
People from Sydney
Australian female dancers
Australian ballroom dancers
Dancing with the Stars (Australian TV series) winners
21st-century Australian dancers
Australian expatriates in England